WVNU (97.5 FM) is a radio station  broadcasting an Adult contemporary format. Started in 1994 by Pat and Elaine Hays and licensed to Greenfield, Ohio, United States. The station is currently owned by Southern Ohio Broadcasting and features programming from CBS News Radio, Westwood One and Brownfield Ag Networks. WVNU also broadcasts The Ohio State University football games and local sports from McClain, Washington Court House, Miami Trace, Fairfield and other local football and basketball teams.  WVNU is the only CBS News Radio affiliate in South West Ohio that broadcasts CBS "News on the Hour" on a 24/7 basis.

References

External links

WVNU